Pseudebulea kuatunensis is a moth in the family Crambidae. It was described by Eugene G. Munroe and Akira Mutuura in 1968. It is found in Fujian and Hubei provinces of China.

Subspecies
Pseudebulea kuatunensis kuatunensis (China: Fujian)
Pseudebulea kuatunensis ichangensis Munroe & Mutuura, 1968 (China: Hubei)

References

Moths described in 1968
Pyraustinae